Wilfredo Olivera (born 4 May 1987) is an Argentine professional footballer who plays as a centre-back for Belgrano.

Career
Libertad were Olivera's first senior team, he made his debut for the club in 2007 and remained until 2011 following ninety-one matches and six goals. In June 2011, Olivera joined Quilmes of Primera B Nacional. Four appearances followed in his first season, which ended with promotion to the 2012–13 Argentine Primera División. Olivera had a short spell with Colón in 2014, prior to joining Talleres in Torneo Federal A in the following January. He made thirty-eight appearances and netted five times as Talleres rose from tier three to tier one after back-to-back promotions. He failed to appear for Talleres in the Primera División during 2016–17.

July 2017 saw Olivera depart Talleres to play in Primera B Nacional with Atlético de Rafaela. His first appearance for Rafaela came during an away win over Gimnasia y Esgrima on 15 September. On 30 June 2018, Olivera signed for Sarmiento.

Career statistics
.

Honours
Talleres
Torneo Federal A: 2015
Primera B Nacional: 2016

References

External links

1987 births
Living people
People from Rafaela
Argentine footballers
Association football defenders
Torneo Argentino A players
Primera Nacional players
Argentine Primera División players
Torneo Federal A players
Libertad de Sunchales footballers
Quilmes Atlético Club footballers
Club Atlético Colón footballers
Talleres de Córdoba footballers
Atlético de Rafaela footballers
Club Atlético Sarmiento footballers
Club Atlético Belgrano footballers
Sportspeople from Santa Fe Province